The Taipei Arena is a multi-purpose stadium located in Songshan, Taipei, Taiwan, and it is operated by the Taipei Rapid Transit Corporation (TRTC). Built in 2005, the large multi-purpose stadium can accommodate major international sport events such as ice skating, ice hockey, gymnastics, handball, basketball, tennis, badminton, table tennis, indoor soccer, boxing, judo, karate, taekwondo and wrestling.

Building
It was designed by Archasia, an architectural firm based in Taipei, and Populous, a Kansas City, Missouri, design and architectural firm specializing in sports venues.
It is located at the site of the former Taipei Municipal Baseball Stadium (built in 1958, opened 1959, demolished 2000). The arena was opened on 1 December 2005.
The main arena has an adjustable floor space: its minimum floor space is 60m × 30m, and can be extended to 80m × 40m.

The Chinese Taipei Ice Hockey League (CTIHL) plays out of the auxiliary arena, which is a 60m × 30m ice skating rink.
The basement now houses two large gas turbine power generators to be used for the surrounding district during emergencies.

Taipei Arena Sky Screen

Taipei Arena Sky Screen was constructed in December 2006, on the outer glass wall of Taipei Arena.
It was the world's largest LED display at that time.

The screen is a long arc type outdoor dynamic display, featuring a built in light sensor that enables LED to adjust its own brightness according to ambient lighting. It was built by Optotech and currently operated by Nova Media. It is on 24 hours a day and 365 days a year, displaying mainly corporate advertisements, live coverage and visual creativity supplemented content.

The screen also engages its audience though cross-screen interactive events and applications.

Events
Since opening in 2005, the arena has held more art and cultural activities (such as live concerts) than sporting events, which it was originally designed and built for. These have included Disney on Ice, Cirque du Soleil, and Cats (musical).

International Artists in the table below are highlighted in light blue.

Non-Entertainment Events:
Inaugural ceremony and celebrations of President Ma Ying-Jeou and Vice-President Vincent Siew on 20 May 2008.

Dates Unknown:
Jolin Tsai performed her 1st concert in the arena in November 2006 for her Dancing Forever World Tour.
Japanese singer Ayumi Hamasaki's Asia Tour, which had more than 10,000 tickets sold out in 1 hour. That was the 1st concert at the venue to be performed by a J-Pop artist.
Taiwanese Aborigine pop star Chang Hui-mei's STAR TOUR world tour.
Irish-American dancer and musician Michael Flatley reprises his role as Lord of the Dance in the Feet of Flames 2009 tour.
The Indiana Pacers vs Denver Nuggets game was the first (United States) National Basketball Association game held in the country back in 2009.
In the rotation for the Four Continents Figure Skating Championships.  The venue is a frequent host of the International Skating Union figure skating championship for the Americas, Asia, Oceania, and Africa.

Annual events:
The annual Chinese New Year eve program, Super Star (超級巨星紅白藝能大賞) was held annually since 2011. The live special is based on the NHK's New Year's Eve special Kōhaku Uta Gassen.

Transport
Taipei Arena is accessible from Taipei Arena Station of the Taipei Metro.

References

External links

  
 CIHL official website  

Music venues completed in 2005
Sports venues completed in 2005
Indoor arenas in Taiwan
Culture in Taipei
Sports venues in Taipei
Basketball venues in Taiwan
Handball venues in Taiwan
2005 establishments in Taiwan
Judo venues
Badminton venues
Badminton in Taiwan